Sir Herbert Lloyd, 1st Baronet (22 July 1720 – 19 August 1769) was a Welsh politician.

Lloyd was born in Llanddewibrefi and educated at Jesus College, Oxford. His father, Walter Lloyd of Voelallt, Cardiganshire, was attorney-general for south Wales and was succeeded by Herbert's elder brother, John Lloyd. Herbert Lloyd also trained as a lawyer, and was called to the bar by the Inner Temple in 1742. In 1761 he became MP for Cardigan Boroughs, and in 1763 he was created a baronet. His later years were marked by increasing debt, the loss of his parliamentary seat and poor health. He died en route to Bath; there is no foundation for the tradition that he committed suicide. Although he was married twice, he left no heir.

Sources
Dictionary of Welsh Biography Online

1720 births
1769 deaths
Alumni of Jesus College, Oxford
Baronets in the Baronetage of Great Britain
Members of the Inner Temple
Members of the Parliament of Great Britain for Welsh constituencies
British MPs 1761–1768